Petra Haden Sings: The Who Sell Out is an album by Petra Haden, an entirely a cappella interpretation of the album The Who Sell Out by English rock band The Who. Haden supplies all of the vocals. It was released in 2005 on Bar None Records.  The recording was inspired by former Minutemen bassist Mike Watt, who gave Haden the 8-track recorder with the original Who album on it.

In the Boston Globe on 13 March 2005, The Who's guitarist and principal songwriter, Pete Townshend, had this to say about Haden's version of the album:

In his book Paddle Your Own Canoe, actor Nick Offerman recommends the album as ideal to listen to while building canoes.

Track listing
"Armenia City in the Sky"
"Heinz Baked Beans"
"Mary Anne with the Shaky Hand"
"Odorono"
"Tattoo"
"Our Love Was"
"I Can See for Miles"
"I Can't Reach You"
"Medac"
"Relax"
"Silas Stingy"
"Sunrise"
"Rael"

Listening

2005 albums
Petra Haden albums
The Who
Covers albums
Concept albums
A cappella albums